Teresa "Tessie" Reynolds (20 August 1876 – 13 July 1954) was an English cyclist who in 1893 set a record for cycling from Brighton to London and back in 8 hours 30 minutes. She was aged sixteen at the time and dressed in "rational" clothing: pantaloons, a shirt and coat. The outfit, which was likely made for her by her sister, led to significant publicity and her ride came to be regarded as a milestone for women's rights. The record was broken in 1894 and Reynolds went on to be a London traffic safety officer.

Biography

Tessie Reynolds was born on the Isle of Wight and grew up in Brighton, the eldest of 11 children. Her father, Robert James Reynolds, was a gymnastic instructor and cycle agent, who encouraged sports among his children. He was a member of National Cycling Union and Secretary of a cycling club, as well as umpire for professional races. Her mother, Charlotte, ran a boarding house in Kemptown, which specifically catered for cyclists and which Reynolds helped at. In September 1893, when Reynolds was sixteen years old, she rode a man's bike from Brighton to London and back in a day. Her father acted as the time keeper for the ride.

Women's clothes at the time included long dresses and tight corsets, impractical for cycling; so Reynolds instead wore a "rational" outfit of pantaloons "cropped and cinched below the knee", with a shirt and long coat. It is likely that the outfit was made specifically for Reynolds by her sister, Ada, who was a dress maker. The outfit caused outrage, with suggestions that it was inappropriately masculine and that she was cycling in her knickerbockers. The publicity traveled as far as America, and the outfit was promoted by proponents of Victorian dress reform, as Reynolds clearly intended. She was active in promoting dress reform five years prior to the foundation of the local cycling dress reform club and continued to wear the outfit regularly.

Cycling magazine wrote a scathing report on the "scantiness" of the outfit, complaining of loss of modesty and calling the feat a "lamentable incident". Similarly, the Yorkshire Evening Post pointed out that cycling was not a pleasant sight for a man, but that a woman's "abnormal hips" made it worse. The publicity, despite being negative, helped improve women's rights with the suffragette movement in particular noting it was a big milestone. Further, it helped show that women need not be tied to the street that they grew up in and had a means to travel. Another effect of the publicity was that Reynolds received love letters, including a marriage proposal from a stranger who was apparently significantly older than her. Reynolds and her family took advantage of the celebrity status, with Reynolds promoting a number of female bicycles over the following years, always in rational cycling attire.

The record stood for a year before it was beaten by 42 minutes in September 1894 by E. White from Dover Road Club. Reynold's ride led her to be noted as a key 19th-century cyclist. She was denied the possibility of starting a Brighton branch of the national Female Cycling Association when she was 18, supposedly due to her age and "lack of experience", but more likely due to association with her rational outfit.

In 1908, Reynolds married Montague Salisbury Main and moved to Barnet, Hertfordshire (now North London), having three children who all died in childhood. There she became a road safety officer, a role rarely performed by women in London during the 1930s and 1940s. By 1948, her husband also died and she focused her work on accident prevention. Reynolds died in 1954, aged 77, with local papers covering her death.

Notes

References

1876 births
1955 deaths
Sportspeople from Brighton
English female cyclists
People from Newport, Isle of Wight